Mangelwurzel or mangold wurzel (from German Mangel/Mangold, "chard" and Wurzel, "root"), also called mangold, mangel beet, field beet,  fodder beet and (archaic) root of scarcity, is a cultivated root vegetable. It is a variety of Beta vulgaris, the same species that also contains the red beet (beetroot) and sugar beet varieties. The cultivar group is named Crassa Group. Their large white, yellow or orange-yellow swollen roots were developed in the 18th century as a fodder crop for feeding livestock.

Uses

Contemporary use is primarily for cattle, pig and other stock feed, although it can be eaten – especially when young – by humans. Considered a crop for cool-temperate climates, the mangelwurzel sown in autumn can be grown as a winter crop in warm-temperate to subtropical climates. Both leaves and roots may be eaten. Leaves can be lightly steamed for salads or lightly boiled as a vegetable if treated like spinach or chard, which is a member of the same subspecies. Grown in well-dug, well-composted soil and watered regularly, the roots become tender, juicy, and flavourful. The roots are prepared boiled like potato for serving mashed, diced, or in sweet curries. Animals are known to thrive upon this plant; both its leaves and roots provide a nutritious food. George Henderson, a 20th-century English farmer and author on agriculture, described mangel beets as one of the best fodders for dairying, as milk production is maximized.

The mangelwurzel has a history in England of being used for sport ("mangold hurling"), for celebration, for animal fodder, and for the brewing of a potent alcoholic beverage. The 1830 Scottish cookbook The Practice of Cookery includes a recipe for a beer made with mangelwurzel. In 19th-century American usage, mangel beets were sometimes referred to as "mango".

During the Irish Famine (1845–1852), Poor Law Guardians in Galway City leased (on a 999-year-lease) an  former nunnery to house 1,000 orphaned or deserted boys ages from five to about 15. Here, the boys were taught tailoring, shoe making, and agricultural skills. On a  plot, they grew potatoes, cabbage, parsnips, carrots, onions, Swedish turnips, and "mangold wurtzel", both for workhouse consumption and for a cash crop.

As with most foods, subsisting on solely one crop can produce dietary deficiency. The food shortages in Europe after World War I caused great hardships, including cases of mangel-wurzel disease, as relief workers called it.  It was a consequence of eating only beets.

Growing requirements 
In general, mangelwurzel are easy to grow. They may require supplementary potassium for optimum yields, flavour, and texture, and foliage readily displays potassium deficiency as interveinal chlorosis. This can be corrected with either organic or inorganic sources of potash.

Mangelwurzel is very susceptible to damage from frost. It is suited to southern parts of England where the climate is too warm and dry for the successful cultivation of turnip.

In tradition
In South Somerset, on the last Thursday of October every year, Punkie Night is celebrated. Children carry around lanterns called "Punkies", which are hollowed-out mangelwurzels. Mangelwurzels also are, or previously were, carved out for Halloween in Norfolk, Wales, parts of Yorkshire and northwest Cumberland (Workington) and Devon.

John Le Marchant recommends cutting the "mangel-wurzel" to learn the proper mechanics for a draw cut with the broadsword in his historic manual on swordsmanship.

In an early article in The Lancet, Thompson A and Minx M cite Mangelwurzel seeds as an effective relief for constipation when taken per anum (through the anus) after scoring the husk.

Mangelwurzel seeds were sent by Benjamin Rush to George Washington.

See also
 Beet
 Beetroot
 Rutabaga
 Turnip
 Chard
 The Wurzels, a British band
 Worzel Gummidge, a British book, later adapted into a television series.

References

Further reading
Commerell, Abbé de Mémoire et instruction sur la culture, l’usage et les avantages de la racine de disette ou betterave champêtre, Paris : Impr. royale, 1786, 8vo., 24 p. / 1788, 4to., 15 p. / Paris : Buisson, 1786, 8vo., 44 p. / 1787 (3e éd.), 8vo., 47 p. / Metz : Impr. de Ve Antoine et fils, et Paris : Impr. de Ve Hérissant, 1786, 8vo., 40 p. / Paris : chez Onfroy et Petit, 1788, 8vo., 47 p. / édition raccourcie, Paris, Impr. royale, 1788, 4to., 15 p.
--do.-- An Account of the Culture and Use of the Mangel Wurzel, or root of scarcity, London : C. Dilly, 1787, 8vo., 56 p. / 3rd ed. Edited by John Coakley Lettsom. London : C. Dilly, 1787, 8vo., xxxix, 51 p.

External links

 The Guardian online report on Post Office closures, during which protesters used Mangelwurzel lanterns as a symbol of village tradition

Amaranthaceae
Biogas substrates
Root vegetables
Fodder